Euxesta stigmatias is a species of  picture-winged fly in the genus Euxesta of the family Ulidiidae. The larva attacks maize (and occasionally other crops) in tropical and subtropical parts of the Americas. It is invasive in North America.

References

External links
Pest Information Wiki
 Euxesta stigmatias on the UF / IFAS Featured Creatures Web site

stigmatias
Insects described in 1868